"Love Lies Bleeding" is a song by Australian dance and techno band, Sonic Animation. It was released in February 1999 as the lead single from Sonic Animation's second studio album, Orchid for the Afterworld. The song peaked at number 50 on the ARIA charts.

At the ARIA Music Awards of 1999, the song was nominated for ARIA Award for Best Dance Release.

Track listing
 CD Single (GRS1111)
 "Love Lies Bleeding" (Exordium) - 4:00
 "Love Lies Bleeding" (Radio edit) - 4:18
 "Love Lies Bleeding" (Love Lies Beating radio mix) - 4:16
 "Love Lies Bleeding" (Love Lies Beating Full mix) - 7:11
 "Love Lies Bleeding" (Bleeding Bass Chasin' Heavens mix) - 6:10

 12" Single (ML10709)
 "Love Lies Bleeding" (Album Length mix)
 "Love Lies Bleeding" (Love Lies Beating Full mix)
 "Love Lies Bleeding" (House of Rector mix)
 "Love Lies Bleeding" (Bleeding Bass Chasin' Heavens mix)

Charts

Release history

References

1998 songs
1999 singles